The Dallas–Fort Worth Film Critics Association Award for Best Documentary Film is an award presented by the Dallas–Fort Worth Film Critics Association (DFWFCA) to honor an outstanding documentary film.

History
Although the DFWFCA began handing out awards in 1990, they first added this category in 2002. To date, only three directors have earned the honor more than once: Davis Guggenheim (2006, 2010), Michael Moore (2002, 2004), and Morgan Neville (2013, 2018)

Winners
 † = Winner of the Academy Award for Best Documentary Feature Film
 ‡ = Nominated for the Academy Award for Best Documentary Feature Film

2000s

2010s

2020s

References

External links
 Official website

Documentary Film
American documentary film awards
Awards established in 2002